Samuel Nelson Boateng (born 14 May 1968) is a retired Ghanaian sprinter who specialized in the 200 metres.

He won the bronze medal at the 1989 African Championships. At the 1993 African Championships he won bronze medals both in the 100 and 200 metres. The same year he competed at the 1993 World Championships. He was knocked out in the semi-final, having set a career best time of 20.52 seconds in the heats. He also competed at the 1992 Olympic Games (Barcelona).

In college, he was a 2-time NCAA All-American for the Alabama Crimson Tide in the 200-metres (1993) and 4 X 100 metres Relay (1991) as a Finalist in both events.

External links

1968 births
Living people
Ghanaian male sprinters
Athletes (track and field) at the 1988 Summer Olympics
Athletes (track and field) at the 1990 Commonwealth Games
Athletes (track and field) at the 1992 Summer Olympics
Athletes (track and field) at the 1994 Commonwealth Games
Olympic athletes of Ghana
Commonwealth Games competitors for Ghana
World Athletics Championships athletes for Ghana